The Screen Actors Guild Award for Outstanding Performance by a Female Actor in a Television Movie or Limited Series is an award given by the Screen Actors Guild to honor the finest acting achievements in Miniseries or Television Movie.

Winners and nominees

1990s

2000s

2010s

2020s

Multiples

Multiple winners
 2 wins
 Helen Mirren (Elizabeth I, Phil Spector)
 Queen Latifah (Life Support, Bessie)
 Kate Winslet (Mildred Pierce, Mare of Easttown) 
 Alfre Woodard (The Piano Lesson, Miss Evers' Boys)

Multiple nominees
Note: Winners are indicated in bold type.

 2 nominations
 Patricia Arquette (Escape at Dannemora, The Act)
 Anne Bancroft (Homecoming, The Roman Spring of Mrs. Stone)
 Angela Bassett (Ruby's Bucket of Blood, Betty & Coretta)
 Ellen Burstyn (Oprah Winfrey Presents: Mitch Albom's For One More Day, Flowers in the Attic)
 Judy Davis (A Cooler Climate, Life with Judy Garland: Me and My Shadows)
 Laura Dern (Recount, Big Little Lies)
 Anjelica Huston (Buffalo Girls, The Mists of Avalon)
 Jessica Lange (Grey Gardens, Feud: Bette and Joan)
 Queen Latifah (Life Support, Bessie)
 Sissy Spacek (Midwives, A Place for Annie)
 Emma Thompson (Wit, Angels in America)
 Kerry Washington (Confirmation, Little Fires Everywhere) 
 Emily Watson (Appropriate Adult, Chernobyl)
Kate Winslet (Mildred Pierce, Mare of Easttown)
 Joanne Woodward (Breathing Lessons, Empire Falls)

 3 nominations
 Kathy Bates (The Late Shift, Annie, My Sister's Keeper)
 Glenn Close (Serving in Silence: The Margarethe Cammermeyer Story, In the Gloaming, The Lion in Winter)
 Sally Field (A Woman of Independent Means, A Cooler Climate, David Copperfield)
 Vanessa Redgrave (If These Walls Could Talk 2, The Gathering Storm, The Fever)
 Cicely Tyson (Oldest Living Confederate Widow Tells All, The Road to Galveston, The Trip to Bountiful)
 Sigourney Weaver (Snow White: A Tale of Terror, Prayers for Bobby, Political Animals)
 Alfre Woodard (The Piano Lesson, Miss Evers' Boys, Steel Magnolias)

 4 nominations
 Stockard Channing (A Unexpected Family, The Baby Dance, The Truth About Jane, The Matthew Shepard Story)
 Nicole Kidman (Hemingway & Gellhorn, Grace of Monaco, Big Little Lies, The Undoing)
 Susan Sarandon (Bernard and Doris, You Don't Know Jack, The Secret Life of Marilyn Monroe, Feud: Bette and Joan)

 5 nominations
 Helen Mirren (The Passion of Ayn Rand, Door to Door, The Roman Spring of Mrs. Stone, Elizabeth I, Phil Spector)

See also
 Primetime Emmy Award for Outstanding Lead Actress in a Limited Series or Movie
 Primetime Emmy Award for Outstanding Supporting Actress in a Limited Series or Movie
 Golden Globe Award for Best Actress – Miniseries or Television Film
 Golden Globe Award for Best Supporting Actress – Series, Miniseries or Television Film
 Critics' Choice Television Award for Best Actress in a Movie/Miniseries
 Critics' Choice Television Award for Best Supporting Actress in a Movie/Miniseries

External links
 SAG Awards official site

Female Actor Miniseries
 
Television awards for Best Actress